Krivé is a village and municipality in Bardejov District in the Prešov Region of north-east Slovakia.

History
In historical records the village was first mentioned in 1406, when the village was named Spyskvagasa. From the 15th century onwards it was settled by Ruthenians.

The wooden Greek Orthodox church of St. Luke the Evangelist is of relatively late construction (about 1826). It originally had three cupolas, but two were removed in a restoration of 1969. The church contains a baroque 18th century iconostasis.

Geography
The municipality lies at an altitude of 400 metres and covers an area of 5.276 km².
It has a population of about 200 people.

External links
 
 
https://web.archive.org/web/20070427022352/http://www.statistics.sk/mosmis/eng/run.html 

Villages and municipalities in Bardejov District
Šariš